Üzümlükənd (also, Üzümlü and Uzyumlyukend) is a village in the Qakh Rayon of Azerbaijan. The village forms part of the municipality of Ağyazı.

References 

Populated places in Qakh District